Heather Lieberg (born June 18, 1979) is a female American long-distance runner. She competed in the marathon event at the 2015 World Championships in Athletics in Beijing, China, but was forced to drop out of the race early because of a foot injury.

See also
 United States at the 2015 World Championships in Athletics

References

External links
 

American female long-distance runners
Living people
Place of birth missing (living people)
1979 births
World Athletics Championships athletes for the United States
21st-century American women